The Sandgate-Redcliffe District Cricket Club is a cricket club in Sandgate and Redcliffe, Queensland, Australia. They play in the Queensland Premier Cricket competition. They were founded in 1961.

The Gators are most known for their 3-peat of 2-Day premierships in the 1997/98,1998/99 and 1999/20 seasons. A new era saw The Gators win yet another 3-peat of premierships but in the Queensland Premier Cricket Twenty20 format this time round in the 2015/16, 2016/17 and 2017/18 seasons.

References

External links
 
 

Queensland District Cricket clubs
1960 establishments in Australia
Cricket clubs established in 1960
Sporting clubs in Brisbane
Sandgate, Queensland
Moreton Bay Region